Halil Altıntop (born 8 December 1982) is a Turkish former professional footballer. He is a trainer scout for Bayern Munich. During his playing days, he was deployed as an attacking midfielder, centre-forward, or winger. Halil is the identical twin brother of Hamit Altıntop.

Career
Altıntop started his professional career in the local German club Wattenscheid 09 along with his brother. As successful performances grabbed the attention of bigger clubs, Altıntop was transferred to 1. FC Kaiserslautern, and his brother to Schalke 04. Altıntop, who played as a striker, finished third highest scorer in the Bundesliga for the 2005–06 season with 20 goals.
At the end of that season he joined his brother at Schalke 04 on a free transfer. However, after only one season, his brother Hamit Altıntop joined Bayern Munich on another free deal. On 27 January 2010, he terminated his contract with Schalke 04 and joined Eintracht Frankfurt.

After Eintracht Frankfurt were relegated in the 2010–11 season Altıntop was transferred to Turkish side Trabzonspor signing a three-year contract.

Altıntop joined FC Augsburg in summer 2013. He finished the 2016–17 season with 6 goals and 2 assists in 31 matches. At the end of the season he announced his decision not to renew his contract with club. In this time at Augsburg, he made 116 appearances in the Bundesliga scoring 20 goals and contributing 12 assists.

In June 2017, Altıntop moved to SK Slavia Prague of the Czech First League.

On 31 January 2018, Altintop returned to 1. FC Kaiserslautern on a year-and-a-half contract until 2019.

Career statistics

Club
.

International goals

Managerial statistics
As of 30 June 2020

References

External links

 
 
 
 
 

1982 births
Living people
Association football forwards
Citizens of Turkey through descent
Turkish footballers
Turkey international footballers
Turkey youth international footballers
Turkey B international footballers
Turkey under-21 international footballers
German footballers
German people of Turkish descent
Turkish expatriate footballers
SG Wattenscheid 09 players
1. FC Kaiserslautern players
FC Schalke 04 players
Eintracht Frankfurt players
Trabzonspor footballers
FC Augsburg players
SK Slavia Prague players
Bundesliga players
Süper Lig players
2. Bundesliga players
Czech First League players
Identical twins
Sportspeople from Gelsenkirchen
Expatriate footballers in Germany
German twins
Twin sportspeople
Turkish twins
Footballers from North Rhine-Westphalia